Pfisterer is a surname. Notable people with the surname include:

 Alban "Snoopy" Pfisterer (born 1946), Swiss drummer and keyboardist
 Herman Pfisterer (1866–1905), musician
 Maximilian Pfisterer (born 1997), German ice dancer
 Paul Eddie Pfisterer (born 1951), German music and visual artist
 Ulrich Pfisterer (born 1951), German football player 
 Ulrich Pfisterer (art historian) (born 1968), art historian

See also
 Pfisterer Group, German corporation

German-language surnames
Occupational surnames